District Six is the debut album by Amphibious Assault. It was released in 2003.

Track listing
"Post-Apocalyptic Burn"
"Searchlight"
"District 6"
"There was Light (Arda)"
"Defcon 3"
"In Your Room" (Depeche Mode cover)
"Benedictine"
"The Friendly Neighbour"
"Synergy"
"Revelation 80128"

Amphibious Assault (band) albums
2003 debut albums